Vivian Erzerum Bede McGrath (17 February 1916 – 9 April 1978) was a tennis champion from Australia. Along with John Bromwich, he was one of the early great players to use a two-handed backhand. His name was pronounced "McGraw".

Biography
He was born in Merrendee, near Mudgee, New South Wales, the fourth child of native Australian parents. His father was a hotelkeeper. He went to Sydney Boys High School, graduating in 1932, where he played tennis and cricket. He began playing tennis against a brick walk at his home.

He won the Australian junior singles in 1932 and the French junior singles in 1933. He was a member of the Australian Davis Cup team from 1933 to 1937. He won the Australian Open doubles championship with his friend Jack Crawford in 1935. In 1937, he won the Australian Open singles title against John Bromwich. McGrath was ranked World No. 8 in 1935 by A. Wallis Myers of The Daily Telegraph.

World War II interrupted his career, and he served in the Air Force. He was granted leave to play exhibition games against American servicemen.

After the war, he never regained his form and was plagued by injuries. He eventually became a coach in the southern highlands and pursued his interest in horse racing. He died in Burradoo, New South Wales of heart disease.

Grand Slam finals

Singles: (1 title)

Doubles: (1 title, 5 runners-up)

References

External links 

 Australian Dictionary of Biography (ADB) – McGrath, Vivian Erzerum Bede (1916–1978)
 
 
 

1916 births
1978 deaths
Australian Championships (tennis) champions
Australian Championships (tennis) junior champions
Australian male tennis players
Tennis people from New South Wales
Grand Slam (tennis) champions in men's singles
Grand Slam (tennis) champions in men's doubles
Grand Slam (tennis) champions in boys' singles
People educated at Sydney Boys High School